Denham Golf Club railway station is a railway station near the villages of Baker's Wood and Denham, Buckinghamshire, England.

History

The station was opened on 22 July 1912, at the request of the Golf Club, which had opened the previous year. It is on what was the Great Western and Great Central Joint Railway, which had been opened in 1906. The station was originally called Denham Golf Club Platform, and it was built to serve the adjacent golf club. Between the two World Wars the platforms were lengthened and the station was made a halt. The original "up" platform was on the London side of the road bridge, and made of wood, with an access path connecting to the track leading to the Golf Club. In 1954   British Railways had a new concrete "up" platform built on the Wycombe side of the road bridge, opposite the "down" platform, which was also rebuilt in concrete. At the same time a proposed name change to 'Higher Denham' was rejected.

The station was transferred from the Western Region of British Rail to the London Midland Region on 24 March 1974.

The two waiting rooms are original Great Western Railway "pagoda" shelters. The ticket office, at road level on the down side, was also a pagoda building. Both waiting rooms and the original ticket office have been listed buildings since 27 November 1992, to prevent their replacement by the bus shelter type structures then being installed at other stations on the line. The ticket office was damaged by fire in 2005 and demolished early in 2007. It was replaced with a near replica in 2007, but unlike the original the new building has no clerk's window. The waiting rooms have recently been repainted to match the ticket office.

The original platform lamp-posts were cast iron, marked with the initials "G.W. & G.C. Jt" of the original operator. The lamp-posts were removed when the station lighting — and indeed the whole line — were modernised in about 1991, at about the time as the new Class 165 diesel multiple unit trains entered service.

The station was closed between 16 March to 19 June 2015 to allow Network Rail to undertake major repairs.

Services
This drops to one train every 2 hours each way on Sundays.

The station's service pattern is unusual in that it is served by trains on two completely different routes in either direction. The respective corresponding services in the opposite direction pass through this station non-stop. This means that the only stations to receive direct, regular, all-day services both to and from Denham Golf Club are London Marylebone (the terminus) and Gerrards Cross (the next station to the north).

Denham Golf Club is a Penalty Fares station with automatic ticket facilities but no ticket office. The station is unstaffed.

Notes

References

Further reading

External links

Former Great Western and Great Central Joint Railway stations
Railway stations in Buckinghamshire
Railway stations in Great Britain opened in 1912
Railway stations served by Chiltern Railways
1912 establishments in England
Denham, Buckinghamshire